"Better Living Through Chemistry" is a variant of a 1935 DuPont advertising slogan.

Better Living Through Chemistry may also refer to:

 Better Living Through Chemistry (album), a 1996 album by Fatboy Slim
 Better Living Through Chemistry (film), a 2014 American film starring Sam Rockwell and Olivia Wilde
 "Better Living Through Chemistry", a song from the 2000 album Rated R by Queens of the Stone Age
 "Better Living Through Chemistry", a song from the 2005 album Planets by Adema
 "Better Living Through Chemistry", a Season 3 episode of Miami Vice